Top Coppers (released 19 August 2015) is a British sitcom, co-written and created by Andy Kinnear and Céin McGillicuddy and directed by Céin McGillicuddy. It was broadcast on BBC Three, BBC Two, and was available on Netflix UK.

Background 
Top Coppers follow the adventures of cops John Mahogany (Steen Raskopoulos) and Mitch Rust (John Kearns) as they attempt to rid the fictional world of Justice City from its deranged criminal underworld. They both have red hair (ie copper coloured), giving a double meaning to the show's title.

The universe and its characters are derived from the conventions of American and British police shows of the 70s and 80s, from Starsky & Hutch to The Professionals, but is set in no specific time or country.

The series is based on an independent mini series of the same name, also created by Andy Kinnear and Céin McGillicuddy and with the same actor playing Chief, Donovan Blackwood.

Episodes

Series 1 (2015) 
The first series premiered on 19 August 2015 on BBC Three and ran for 6 episodes which aired on Wednesdays. The first series was repeated on BBC Two on Sundays from 4 October 2015. The series was available on Netflix UK from June 2021 to June 2022.

Cast

Main Cast 
 Steen Raskopoulos - John Mahogany 
 John Kearns - Mitch Rust
 Donovan Blackwood - Chief
 Gabby Best - Helga
 John Hollingworth - Peterson
 Phil Wang - McGockey
 Rio Myers - Zach
Rich Fulcher - Mayor Grady
 Alan Dale - Frank (Voice & photograph)

Guest Cast 
Paul Ritter - Harry McCrane
Danny John-Jules - Captain Woods (the 'rival' police chief of 'Ace Town')
 Diana Vickers - Chris
Kayvan Novak - The Notorious French Thief Gerard Cliché
Natasia Demetriou - Gale
Alex Beckett - Martin
Simon Farnaby - Dr. Schafer
James Fleet - Charles Leatherby
Tom Bennett - Steve
Lydia Rose Bewley - Agent Byrne
Jessica Gunning - Agent Romero
Terry Mynott - Nolan
Adam Riches - Flanagan
Joseph Varley - Varley

Supporting Cast 
John Chancer - Randall Rodgers / Captain Steele
James Doherty - Television Producer
Simon Balch - 'Face Swap' Doctor
Roxy Dunn - Girl in Car
Max Dinnen - Guy in Car
Mark Davison - Clive
Nick Raggett - Security Guard
Julian Seager - Shady Guy
Emily Tebbutt - Chris' Body Double
Belle Williams - Police Officer
Micky Woodman - Burger Chef
Daniel Young - Young Mitch
Tommy Young - Young Vince
Simon Varney - Mitch/Vince Body Double 
Richard Banks - JCPD Police Officer (uncredited)
Roz Brierley - Hospital Patient (uncredited)

Locations 
Whilst the series is mainly shot in at West London Film Studios, there were also some exterior shots and sequences filmed on location.

The exterior of Justice City Police Department is filmed at the main entrance to the Dagenham Civic Centre on Rainham Road North, Dagenham Essex, with the JCPD sign above the door digitally composited to replace the crest above the doorway and a city skyline composited behind the building.

References

External links
 

2015 British television series debuts
BBC television sitcoms
English-language television shows